A fellah (feminine  ; plural fellaheen or fellahin) is a peasant, usually a farmer or agricultural laborer in the Middle East and North Africa. The word derives from the Arabic word for "ploughman" or "tiller".

Due to a continuity in beliefs and lifestyle with that of the Ancient Egyptians, the fellahin of Egypt have been described as the "true Egyptians".

A fellah could be seen wearing a simple Egyptian cotton robe called galabieh (jellabiya). The word galabieh originated around 1715–25 and derived from the Egyptian slang word gallabīyah.

Origins and usage

"Fellahin," throughout the Middle East in the Islamic periods referred to native villagers and farmers.  It is translated as "peasants" or "farmers".

Fellahin were distinguished from the effendi (land-owning class), although the fellahin in this region might be tenant farmers, smallholders, or live in a village that owned the land communally. Others applied the term fellahin only to landless workers.

In Egypt 

After the Arab conquest of Egypt, they called the common masses of indigenous peasants fellahin (peasants or farmers) because their ancient work of agriculture and connecting to their lands was different from the Jews who were traders and the Greeks (Rum in Arabic), who were the ruling class. With the passage of time, the name took on an ethnic character, and the Arab elites to some extent used the fellah synonymously with "indigenous Egyptian". Also when a Christian Egyptian converted to Islam he was called falih which means "winner" or "victorious". 

Today the farmers comprise 60% of the Egyptian population, the fellahin lead humble lives and continue to live in mud-brick houses like their ancient ancestors. Their percentage was much higher in the early 20th century, before the large influx of Egyptian fellahin into urban towns and cities. In 1927, anthropologist Winifred Blackman, author of The Fellahin of Upper Egypt, conducted ethnographic research on the life of Upper Egyptian farmers and concluded that there were observable continuities between the cultural and religious beliefs and practices of the fellahin and those of ancient Egyptians.

In the Levant 

In the Levant, the term fellahin also refers to non-Arabic Semitic peoples such as the Arameans. The term fallah was applied to native people from several regions in the North Africa and the Middle East, also including those of Cyprus.

In Dobruja  
During the 19th century, some Muslim Fellah families from Ottoman Syria settled in Dobruja, which was then part of the Ottoman Empire. They fully intermingled with Turks and Tatars of Romania, and were Turkified.

See also
Copts, Egyptian Christian Orthodox
Peasant

References

External links

 Egypt's forgotten fellahin

Egyptian farmers
Indigenous peoples of North Africa
Social history of Egypt